Lysophosphatidic acid receptor 6, also known as LPA6, P2RY5 and GPR87, is a protein that in humans is encoded by the LPAR6 gene. LPA6 is a G protein-coupled receptor that binds the lipid signaling molecule lysophosphatidic acid (LPA).

The protein encoded by this gene belongs to the family of G-protein coupled receptors, that are preferentially activated by adenosine and uridine nucleotides. This gene aligns with an internal intron of the retinoblastoma susceptibility gene in the reverse orientation.

Role in hair growth/loss 

In February 2008, researchers at the University of Bonn announced they have found the genetic basis of two distinct forms of inherited hair loss, opening a broad path to treatments for baldness. They found that mutations in the gene P2RY5 causes a rare, inherited form of hair loss called hypotrichosis simplex. It is the first receptor in humans known to play a role in hair growth. The fact that any receptor plays a specific role in hair growth was previously unknown to scientists, and with this new knowledge a focus on finding more of these genes may be able to lead to therapies for many different types of hair loss.

In 2013, it was found that mutations in LPAR6 give rise to the Cornish Rex cat breed, which has a form of ectodermal dysplasia characterised by short woolly hair which is susceptible to loss.

See also
 Lysophospholipid receptor
 P2Y receptor

References

Further reading

External links
 
 

G protein-coupled receptors